Benjamin Patch (born June 21, 1994) is an American volleyball player. With the United States, Patch was a gold medalist at the 2017 NORCECA Championship.

Personal life
Patch was raised by white, Mormon adoptive parents in Utah, and he served as a missionary in Columbus, Ohio, for one year.

In October 2020, Patch publicly came out as queer in the German publication Der Tagesspiegel. He became the first openly queer active player in a German men's professional sports league.

Patch maintains an active ceramic art practice and a photography business alongside his professional volleyball career.

Sporting achievements

College
 National championships
 2013  NCAA national championship, with BYU Cougars
 2016  NCAA national championship, with BYU Cougars
 2017  NCAA national championship, with BYU Cougars

Clubs
 National championships
 2018/2019  German Championship, with Berlin Recycling Volleys
 2019/2020  German SuperCup, with Berlin Recycling Volleys
 2019/2020  German Cup, with Berlin Recycling Volleys
 2021/2022  German SuperCup, with Berlin Recycling Volleys
 2021/2022  German Championship, with Berlin Recycling Volleys

Youth national team
 2012  NORCECA U21 Championship

Individual awards
 2012: NORCECA U21 Championship – Most Valuable Player
 2013: NCAA national championship – All-Tournament Team

References

External links

 Player profile at USAVolleyball.org
 Player profile at TeamUSA.org 
 
 Player profile at LegaVolley.it 
 Player profile at Volleybox.net
 BYU Cougars – Ben Patch

1994 births
Living people
Sportspeople from Provo, Utah
LGBT volleyball players
American men's volleyball players
American expatriate sportspeople in Italy
Expatriate volleyball players in Italy
American expatriate sportspeople in Germany
Expatriate volleyball players in Germany
BYU Cougars men's volleyball players
Opposite hitters